The dorsal nerve of the clitoris is a nerve in females that branches off the pudendal nerve to innervate the clitoris. The nerve is important for female sexual pleasure, and it may play a role in clitoral erections.

It travels from below the inferior pubic ramus to the suspensory ligament of the clitoris. The DNC splits into two nerve branches on either side of the midline, closely following the crura of the clitoris.

Some surgeries—for example, sling surgeries to treat female urinary incontinence—can damage the DNC, causing a loss of sensation in the clitoris. Understanding the nerve is important for urologists and gynecologists who may operate on organs near the DNC.

The dorsal nerve of the clitoris is analogous to the dorsal nerve of the penis in males.  It is a terminal branch of the pudendal nerve.

See also
 Posterior labial nerves
 Perineal nerve
 Dorsal nerve of penis
 Dorsal artery of clitoris

References

External links
  - "The Female Perineum: The Deep Perineal Pouch"
 http://ect.downstate.edu/courseware/haonline/figs/l41/410407.htm
 
 

Nerves of the lower limb and lower torso
Clitoris